Senjuti Saha is a Bangladeshi scientist at the Child Health Research Foundation (CHRF), and board member of the Polio Transition Independent Monitoring Board (TIMB) of the World Health Organization (WHO). She is known for her lead on decoding the genome of SARS-CoV2 in Bangladesh.

Biography and education
Saha was born and raised in Dhaka, Bangladesh. Her father Dr. Samir Kumar Saha is a microbiologist and her mother Dr. Setarunnahar Setara is a public health researcher. Senjuti Saha finished high school in Bangladesh. After finishing A level, she started her Bachelor of Science with biochemistry major at the University of Toronto. She has also received her PhD from the same institute.

Work
Senjuti saha started her career as post-doctoral research fellow at The Hospital for Sick Children in Toronto, Canada. She was also appointed as a post-doctoral researcher at the Child Health Research Center (CHRF) in Bangladesh. In 2019, she joined CHRF as scientist. Currently she is also appointed by the WHO as board member of Polio Transition Independent Monitoring Board (TIMB).

In 2020, Senjuti Saha and her team decoded the genome sequence of SARS-CoV2 in Bangladesh. Prior to that, she had performed an unbiased metagenomic sequence analysis to show a correlation between pediatric meningitis and Chikungunya virus outbreak in Bangladesh.

References

External links 

 Dr Senjuti Saha, first Bengali microbiologist to be appointed in WHO board

Bangladeshi scientists
Living people
Bengali scientists
University of Toronto alumni
Bangladeshi women academics
Bangladeshi women scientists
Year of birth missing (living people)
Bangladeshi microbiologists